2017 Czech Lion Awards ceremony was held on 10 March 2018. Ice Mother has won 6 awards including Award for the best film.

Winners and nominees

Non-statutory Awards
 Best Film Poster
Barefoot - Jiří Karásek, Lukáš Fišárek
 Film Fans Award
''Barefoot - Jan Svěrák Magnesie Award for Best Student Film
 Atlantida, 2003'' – Michal Blaško

References

2017 film awards
Czech Lion Awards ceremonies